Shweta Pandit (born 7 July 1986) is an Indian singer and actress from Bollywood. She is the grand-niece of Indian classical vocalist and Padma Vibhushan awardee, Pandit Jasraj. She has also recorded popular songs for various Telugu and Tamil film songs and many other Indian languages.

Music career
At the young age of 4, Shweta worked with Indian composer, Ilayaraja for the award-winning film Anjali, which was re-recorded in Hindi. She re-dubbed for the lead child in the film and also sang the songs in Hindi, making her one of the youngest singers in the Bollywood Music Industry. She also recorded for legendary tabla player Ustad Zakkir Hussain at the age of 9 for his first film as composer, Saaz.

She had her breakthrough with Yash Raj Films and Aditya Chopra's Mohabbatein (2000) with five songs at the age of 14. She was chosen to sing in the film after she auditioned for the final selection amongst several singers. Her notable hits include "Ishq Khudai" from Rudraksh (2003), "Halla Re" from Neal 'n' Nikki (2005), "Chorre ki baatein" from Fight Club (2006), "You're my love" from Partner (2007), "Tera Sarapa" from Welcome (2007), "Bandhane Lagi" from Naach (2005), "Jhini Jhini" from Sarkar Raj (2008), "Raghupati Raghav" from Satyagraha (2011), "Chadha de Rang" from Yamla Pagla Deewana (2011), Thug le" from Ladies vs Ricky Bahl (2011), "Madhubala" from Mere Brother Ki Dulhan (2011), "Tere Hoke Rahenge" from Raja Natwarlal (2014), and "Heera" from Highway (2014).

Her debut record album Main Zindagi Hoon (2002) released when she was only 16 years old with EMI Virgin Records, India, making her the youngest Indian Pop star. She released 3 videos from this album, featuring herself. Her other pop albums include Aplam Chaplam (2005) featuring Bollywood superstar Salman Khan. Strumm Sound Digital released 2 unwind remix videos featuring her, titled "Pyar mein kabhi kabhi" and the Sufi classic "Allah hoo" (2017). Indian TV channel Tata Sky released 2 Indian ghazal videos featuring her in their maiden venture featuring "Main aur meri Awaargi" and "Sukoon-e-dil" (2015).

In 2011, Shweta collaborated with popular Punjabi singer and actor Harbhajan Mann for the song Sun Mere Chann Mahiya for the album Heer Ranjha (OST).

In 2012, Shweta was introduced in the Tamil playback singing industry with a hat trick of releases for composer Yuvan Shankar Raja. Vettai, Billa II and Aadhi Baghavan fetching her the finest reviews for her renditions and also winning awards for the same.

Controversy
As per the reports, Singer Anu Malik harassed Shweta sexually when she was 15 years old.

Awards
Shweta won her first Filmfare Award for Best Female Playback Singer for the Telugu hit Kotha Bangaru Lokam (2009), for the song Nenani Neevani, by Mickey J Meyer. She also won the Radio Mirchi Best Female Playback Singer for her first Tamil hit solo Idhayam, from Billa 2 (2012) and the MAA Award for Telugu Best Female Playback Singer for the Nagarjuna starrer Shirdi Sai (2013) for the song Amararaama, composed by M. M. Keeravani.

Television
Her first reality television show as a playback singer in 2008, Mission Ustaad on Channel 9x, was produced by the United Nations and judged by A. R. Rahman and Javed Akhtar. The show was one of the biggest television series presented by the United Nations and had accomplished singers from Bollywood performing together for various causes for the United Nations.

Shweta hosted and presented the television singing show Asia's Singing Superstar (2016) with Pakistani actor Ahsan Khan telecasted in Dubai, Pakistan and several Asian countries, judged by Shankar Mahadevan and Shafqat Amanat Ali Khan on ZEE TV and GEO TV.

Shweta hosted the Mirchi Music Awards (2016) with popular singer/host Sonu Nigam as well.

Shweta was invited on Indian Idol - Junior (2015) as a guest artist, singing with the young talents of India.

Shweta was roped in for Mirchi Music Awards (2017) to pay tribute to biggest Indian composer, AR Rahman for completing 25 years in the music industry, her renditions of "Kehna hi kya", "Satrangi Re" and "Haye Rama" at the award night went viral on her YouTube channel with rave reviews.

Popular live performances
In 2009, Shweta Pandit became part as lead vocals/performer for Oscar Award Winner, A R Rahman's – Jai Ho Journey Home Concert – World Tour. Touring as the lead female vocalist, across the globe, including USA, Canada, UK, Europe, UAE, South Africa, Australia and several countries in Asia.

Also featured as the lead female vocalist for the grand IPL (Indian Premiere League) Opening Ceremony 2011 with composer AR Rahman performing the Oscar-winning song "JAI HO" in Mumbai.

Shweta performed Jai Ho from Slumdog Millionaire with A.R. Rahman at the Nobel Peace Prize Concert on 10 December 2010 in Oslo, Norway, hosted by Denzel Washington and Anne Hathaway, sharing the stage with Jamiroquai, Florence and the machine, India Arie, Herbie Hancock, Barry Manilow and Colbie Caillat singing the Michael Jackson hit Man in the Mirror.

Shweta also featured as the lead female vocalist for the grand IPL (Indian Premiere League) Opening Ceremony 2016 with America's Major Lazer, along with Katrina Kaif, Honey Singh, DJ Bravo, Fuse ODG, Ranveer Singh and Jacqueline Fernandez performing their No. 1 Hit "Lean On" to a live television audience of over a billion people across India.

Personal life
In 2016, Pandit married Ivano Fucci, an Italian film producer, in a traditional Indian wedding held at Jodhpur. Their wedding video went viral on social media as the best cultural mix wedding seen in recent times. Actors Jackie Shroff & Shruti Hassan were also at the wedding.

Pandit delivered her first child, a baby girl named Izana, on 8 February 2020, amid COVID-19 pandemic in Florence, Italy.

Featured AD commercials and acting career
Pandit featured in the Coca-Cola (TVC) featuring Indian cricketer Gautam Gambhir and directed by Dibakar Banerjee. Her other commercials include Greelam laminates, directed by National award-winning Ram Madhvani, who praised her for her comic timing in the commercial.

She acted in David, directed by Bejoy Nambiar. It features her in her first acting role in 3 Indian languages, featuring Neil Mukesh, Chiyaan Vikram, Jiiva, Lara Dutta, Tabu and Naasar, who played her father.

She has also acted with Anil Kapoor in 24 (Indian TV series) (2014), directed by Abhiney Deo on Colors channel (Season 1).

In 2015, she did a powerful role as Madhu, with actor Sara Loren in Barkhaa, earning rave reviews for her performance.

In 2018, Shweta did the lead role as Prisha, the lady who plots and plans against her own lover to win his life insurance, abetting him to suicide in crime-thriller Naash which was a 4-episodic web-series on YouTube.

Shweta Pandit Productions released the debut album of her sister Shrradha Pandit's Teri Heer in October 2008, with Sony Music India.

Discography

Hindi

 Sardaar Gabbar Singh (2016) - "Pariyon Si" 
 Guddu Ki Gun (2015) - "Reh-bara Ve" 
 Raja Natwarlal (2014) - "Tere Hoke Rehengay" (reprise)
 Lekar Hum Deewana Dil (2014) - "Khalifa", "Beqasoor"
 Highway (2014) - "Heera"
 Satya 2 (2013) - "Tu Nahi"
 Zanjeer (2013) - "Katilana"
 Satyagraha (2013) - "Satyagraha"
 David (2013)
 Main Krishna Hoon (2013)
 Cigarette Ki Tarah (2012)
 Chaar Din Ki Chandni (2012)
 Joker (2012)
 Will You Marry Me? (2012)
 Tell Me O Kkhuda (2011)
 Ladies vs Ricky Bahl (2011)
 Mere Brother Ki Dulhan (2011)
 Yeh Dooriyan (2011)
 Khap (2011)
 Bhindi Baazaar Inc. (2011)
 Angel (2011)
 Yamla Pagla Deewana (2011)
 Prateeksha (2011)
 Hisss (2010) (Soundtrack artist)
 Hello Darling (2010)
 Antardwand (2010)
 Do Dilon Ke Khel Mein (2010)
 My Friend Ganesha 3 (2010) [Animation]
 3 Nights 4 Days (2009)
 Fast Forward  (2009)
 Vaada Raha (2009)
 Aamras (2009)
 Agyaat (2009)
 Zor Lagaa Ke...Haiya! (2009)
 Kaashh... Mere Hote! (2009)
 Deshdrohi (2008)
 Phoonk (2008)
 Sarkar Raj (2008)
 Welcome (2007)
 Partner (2007)
 Ram Gopal Varma Ki Aag (2007)
 Mr. Hot Mr. Kool (2007)
 Shiva (2006)
 Kattputli (2006)
 Kabhi Alvida Naa Kehna (2006)
 Teesri Aankh: The Hidden Camera (2006)
 Fight Club (2006)
 Neal 'n' Nikki (2005)
 Dil Jo Bhi Kahey... (2005)
 James (2005)
 Iqbal (2005)
 Naach (2004)
 Tauba Tauba (2004)
 Julie (2004)
 Gayab (2004)
 Aetbaar (2004)
 Stumped (2003)
 Nayee Padosan (2003)
 Rudraksh (2003)
 Aap Mujhe Achche Lagne Lage (2002)
 Soch (2002)
 Haasil (2002)
 Ye Kya Ho Raha Hai (2002)
 The Perfect Husband (2002)
 Mohabbatein (2000)
 Raju Chacha (2000)
 Dil Kya Kare (1999)
 Saaz (1998)

Telugu

Tamil

 Pyaar Prema Kaadhal (2018) I will never let you go, Never let me go, It's over Inji Iduppazhagi (2015) Mella Mella"
 Anjaan (2014)
 David (2013)
 Aadhi Bhagavan (2013)
 Billa II (2012)
 Vettai (2012)

Punjabi

 Heer and Hero (2013)
 Viyah 70 km (2013)
 Power Cut (2012)
 Pinky Moge Wali (2012)
 Lagda Ishq Hogaya (2009)
 Heer Ranjha (2009)

Bengali

 Abhimaan (2016) - "Mon Bechara"
 Inspector Notty K (2018) - "Chai Na Kichui"

Dubbing
 High School Musical 2 (2007)
 High School Musical (2006)

Spiritual and Sanskrit devotional albums
 Mahalakshmi with Padma Vibhushan Pandit Jasraj
 Dashavatar with Rattan Mohan Sharma
 Ganesha with Shankar Mahadevan
 Sukh Samriddhi Suraksha with Shrradha Pandit
 Raaz Diyan Gallan with Gurmit Singh
 The Stars'' with Gurmit Singh

References

External links

 

Living people
Indian women pop singers
Indian women playback singers
Bollywood playback singers
Bengali-language singers
Punjabi-language singers
Tamil playback singers
Telugu playback singers
Filmfare Awards South winners
21st-century Indian women singers
21st-century Indian singers
21st-century Indian actresses
Singers from Mumbai
Women musicians from Maharashtra
1986 births